Wesel I is an electoral constituency (German: Wahlkreis) represented in the Bundestag. It elects one member via first-past-the-post voting. Under the current constituency numbering system, it is designated as constituency 113. It is located in the Ruhr region of North Rhine-Westphalia, comprising most of the district of Wesel.

Wesel I was created for the inaugural 1949 federal election. Since 2021, it has been represented by Rainer Keller of the Social Democratic Party (SPD).

Geography
Wesel I is located in the Ruhr region of North Rhine-Westphalia. As of the 2021 federal election, it comprises the entirety of the Wesel district excluding the municipalities of Dinslaken, Moers, and Neukirchen-Vluyn.

History
Wesel I was created in 1949, then known as Rees – Dinslaken. From 1965 through 1976, it was named Dinslaken. It acquired its current name in the 1980 election. In the 1949 election, it was North Rhine-Westphalia constituency 27 in the numbering system. From 1953 through 1961, it was number 86. From 1965 through 1976, it was number 84. From 1980 through 1998, it was number 82. From 2002 through 2009, it was number 114. Since 2013, it has been number 113.

Originally, the constituency comprised the districts of Rees and Dinslaken. In the 1980 through 1998 elections, it comprised the municipalities of Dinslaken, Hamminkeln, Hünxe, Schermbeck, Voerde, Wesel, and Xanten from the district of Wesel. It acquired its current borders in the 2002 election.

Members
The constituency was first represented by Franz Etzel of the Christian Democratic Union (CDU) from 1949 to 1953. He was succeeded by Heinrich Lübke until 1961, Arnold Verhoeven until 1965, and Konrad Kraske until 1969. Udo Hein of the Social Democratic Party (SPD) was elected in 1969 and served a single term; Uwe Jens of the SPD retained the constituency in 1972 and served until 2002. Fellow SPD member Hans-Ulrich Krüger served from then until 2009, when Sabine Weiss of the CDU was elected representative. Rainer Keller was elected for the SPD in 2021.

Election results

2021 election

2017 election

2013 election

2009 election

References

Federal electoral districts in North Rhine-Westphalia
1949 establishments in West Germany
Constituencies established in 1949
Wesel (district)